The Bishop of Armidale is the diocesan bishop of the Anglican Diocese of Armidale, Australia. The diocese was established in 1863 as the Diocese of Grafton and Armidale. Thus, its diocesan bishop was known as the Bishop of Grafton and Armidale, until the eastern part of the diocese was formed into the new Diocese of Grafton in 1914.

List of Bishops of Armidale
References

External links

 – official site

 
Lists of Anglican bishops and archbishops
Anglican bishops of Armidale